The Taranaki wars were a series of conflicts in New Zealand's Taranaki Province in the 1860s which form a major part of the New Zealand Wars:

The First Taranaki War (1860–1861), also known as the North Taranaki War
The Second Taranaki War (1864–1866)
Titokowaru's War (1868–1869), which also took place in Taranaki

See also

 New Zealand Wars